The blue-headed fantail (Rhipidura cyaniceps) is a fantail endemic to the northern Philippines where it is found on the islands of Luzon and Catanduanes. Until recently, it was considered conspecific with the Tablas fantail and Visayan fantail.

References

External links

Image at ADW 

blue-headed fantail
Birds of Luzon
Fauna of Catanduanes
blue-headed fantail
blue-headed fantail